The 2019–20 Northern Ireland Football League Cup (known as the BetMcLean League Cup for sponsorship purposes) was the 34th edition of Northern Ireland's football knock-out cup competition for national league clubs, and the sixth edition of the competition as the Northern Ireland Football League Cup. This season's League Cup was contested by 35 of the 36 clubs that started the season in the three divisions of the Northern Ireland Football League. The competition began on 10 August 2019 with the first round, and concluded on 15 February 2020 with the final. The competition was sponsored by McLean Bookmakers.

Linfield were the defending champions, having beaten Ballymena United 1–0 in the 2019 final to lift the League Cup for a record tenth time. However, their defence of the cup came to an end after a defeat against Coleraine in the semi-finals. Coleraine would go on to win the cup for the second time, with a 2–1 win over Crusaders in the final. This was their first League Cup title in 32 years, since winning the 1987–88 competition - a new record for the longest gap between League Cup titles. Crusaders suffered defeat in a League Cup final for the sixth time - another new record in the competition.

Format and schedule
The competition was open to the 35 members of the Northern Ireland Football League (NIFL). The top sixteen ranked clubs from the 2018–19 season (all twelve 2018–19 NIFL Premiership clubs, along with the top four clubs from the 2018–19 NIFL Championship) entered the competition in the second round as seeds. Of the remaining twenty NIFL clubs, eight of them were randomly drawn to face each other in four first round matches. The remaining twelve clubs, along with the four first round winners, made up the sixteen unseeded clubs in the second round. Lurgan Celtic were included in the original draw, but later withdrew from the Northern Ireland Football League for financial reasons. This meant that Crusaders received a bye into the third round.

From the third round onwards, the competition operated in a straight knockout format. Replays were not used in the competition, with all matches using extra time and penalties to determine the winner if necessary.

Results
The league tier of each club at the time of entering the competition is listed in parentheses.

First round
The first round matches took place on 10 August 2019.

|}

Second round
The second round matches were played on 27 and 28 August 2019. The top 16 league clubs from the previous season were seeded in this round in order to avoid drawing each other. As a result of Lurgan Celtic's withdrawal from the league, Crusaders received a bye into the third round.

|-
|colspan="3" style="background:#E8FFD8;"|27 August 2019

|-
|colspan="3" style="background:#E8FFD8;"|28 August 2019

|-
|colspan="3" style="background:#E8FFD8;"|17 September 2019

|}

Third round
The third round matches were played on 8 and 23 October 2019.

|-
|colspan="3" style="background:#E8FFD8;"|8 October 2019

|-
|colspan="3" style="background:#E8FFD8;"|23 October 2019

|}

Quarter-finals
The quarter-finals were played on 29 October 2019.

|}

Semi-finals
The semi-finals took place on 3 December 2019.

|}

Final
The final was played on 15 February 2020 at Windsor Park, Belfast.

References

Lea
2019–20 European domestic association football cups
2019-20